Bruno Bassoul (born 8 February 1957) is a Lebanese former swimmer. He competed in four events at the 1972 Summer Olympics.

References

External links
 

1957 births
Living people
Lebanese male swimmers
Olympic swimmers of Lebanon
Swimmers at the 1972 Summer Olympics
Place of birth missing (living people)